Andrés Isola (born 20 December 1974) is a Uruguayan windsurfer. He competed in the men's Mistral One Design event at the 1996 Summer Olympics.

References

External links
 
 

1974 births
Living people
Uruguayan windsurfers
Uruguayan male sailors (sport)
Olympic sailors of Uruguay
Sailors at the 1996 Summer Olympics – Mistral One Design
Place of birth missing (living people)